The Federal Social Court is the German federal court of appeals for social security cases, mainly cases concerning the public health insurance, long-term care insurance, pension insurance and occupational accident insurance schemes. Trial courts for these cases are the Sozialgerichte (Social Courts). Appeals against decisions of these courts are heard by the Landessozialgerichte  (Superior State Social Courts), before the cases may wind up at the Bundessozialgericht.

The Bundessozialgericht is located in the city of Kassel.

History 
The Federal Social Court was founded on 11 September 1954 and its first session was on 23 March 1955.

Function
The Federal Social court hears appeals against decisions of the Landessozialgerichte (Superior State Social Courts) or in special circumstances against decisions of the Sozialgerichte.

Organisation
The Chambers of the Federal Social Court are called Senat. They each consist of 3 Judges and 2 lay judges.
The court consists of 14 Chambers. 

 1. Senat: public health insurance
 2. Senat: occupational accident insurance
 3. Senat: public health insurance, long-term care insurance, social insurance for artists
 4. Senat: basic needs coverage for people looking for employment 
 5. Senat: statutory pension insurance
 6. Senat: contracts with dentists and doctors
 7. Senat: benefits for asylum seekers
 8. Senat: Sozialhilfe
 9. Senat: damages, disability, help for blind people
 10. Senat: pensions for farmers, benefits regarding child care, legal protection against artificially long trials
 11. Senat: unemployment benefits, and other matters involving the Bundesagentur für Arbeit
 12. Senat: insurance membership and payments
 13. Senat: statutory pension insurance
 14. Senat: basic needs for people looking for employment, §6a+$6b Kindergeldgesetz

References

External links

Official homepage

Germany
Courts in Germany
Kassel
1954 establishments in West Germany
Courts and tribunals established in 1954